Timothy C. Collins, born 1956, is the founder, senior managing director, and chief executive officer of Ripplewood Holdings LLC. He is also a member of the board of directors of Citigroup. Collins is a director of several public companies as well as some of Ripplewood's private portfolio companies.

History and education
Collins was born in Frankfort, Kentucky. He has a B.A. degree in philosophy from DePauw University (1978), and an MBA from Yale School of Management.

He began his career in finance, marketing, and manufacturing at Cummins Engine Company. From 1981 to 1984, he worked with the management consulting firm of Booz & Company, specializing in strategic and operational assignments with major industrial and financial firms. He became a vice president at Lazard Frères in New York, then managed Onex Corporation’s New York office. He also served on in many of company boards including Asbury Automotive, Shinsei Bank, Advanced Auto, Rental Services Corp.

Public service
He is involved in several not-for-profit and public sector activities, including the U.S.-Japan Business Council, the Trilateral Commission, the U.S.-Japan Private Sector/Government Commission, Yale Divinity School advisory board, American Friends of the British Museum, Yaddo, the United Board for Christian Higher Education in Asia, Trout Unlimited, and Lenox Hill Neighborhood House and the Tony Blair Faith Foundation. In 2012 he has been appointed chairman of the Yale School of Management Board of Advisors.

Accolades
Collins was named one of the “25 Stars of Asia: Leaders at the Forefront of Change” by BusinessWeek magazine in 2004.

Personal life
Collins is married and has three sons.

References

Private equity and venture capital investors
Living people
American investors
American money managers
American philanthropists
DePauw University alumni
Yale School of Management alumni
1956 births
Place of birth missing (living people)
People from Fostoria, Ohio
American chief executives of financial services companies